Forged Passport is a 1939 American action film directed by John H. Auer and written by Lee Loeb and Franklin Coen. The film stars Paul Kelly, June Lang, Lyle Talbot, Billy Gilbert, Cliff Nazarro and Maurice Murphy. The film was released on April 24, 1939, by Republic Pictures.

Plot
Dan Frazer is a border Patrolman in the                        California-Mexico border with a hot temper, this indirectly leads to the death of a comrade. Dan decides to leave the force and go find his comrade's killer, who he believes is part of smuggler gang.

Cast
Paul Kelly as Dan Frazer
June Lang as Helene
Lyle Talbot as Jack Scott
Billy Gilbert as Nick Mendoza
Cliff Nazarro as 'Shakespeare'
Maurice Murphy as 'Kansas' Nelson
Christian Rub as Mr. Nelson
John Hamilton as Jack Rogers aka 'Lefty'
Dewey Robinson as Riley
Bruce MacFarlane as Buck
Ivan Miller as Capt. Ellis
Frank Puglia as Chief Miguel

References

External links
 

1939 films
1930s English-language films
American action films
1930s action films
Republic Pictures films
Films directed by John H. Auer
American black-and-white films
Films scored by Paul Sawtell
1930s American films